J. R. Fitzpatrick was an American football coach.  With D. J. Brigham, he was the co-head football coach at Cedarville University in 1907, compiling record of 0–1.

Head coaching record

References

Year of birth missing
Year of death missing
Cedarville Yellow Jackets football coaches